The Grand Prix des Frontières was a motor race held at a street circuit in Chimay, Belgium. The race was created by Jules Buisseret, who was also responsible for the circuit's existence. The first event was held in 1926 and was discontinued after the 1972 event for safety reasons.

Since the 1980s, races for classic motorcycles have been run on a reduced version of the Chimay road circuit under the banner of the Grand Prix des Frontières. The full circuit was used for the 2008 anniversary races, but since that year the full circuit has been reserved for special occasions, with the regular annual events using the shorter course.

Winners of the Grand Prix des Frontières

Multiple winners

By year

References

 Circuit of Chimay
 Website of the Chimay race track 

 
Frontieres Grand Prix
Auto races in Belgium
Sport in Chimay
Recurring sporting events established in 1929
1929 establishments in Belgium